Mycelium (plural mycelia) is a root-like structure of a fungus consisting of a mass of branching, thread-like hyphae. Fungal colonies composed of mycelium are found in and on soil and many other substrates. A typical single spore germinates into a monokaryotic mycelium, which cannot reproduce sexually; when two compatible monokaryotic mycelia join and form a dikaryotic mycelium, that mycelium may form fruiting bodies such as mushrooms. A mycelium may be minute, forming a colony that is too small to see, or may grow to span thousands of acres as in Armillaria.

Through the mycelium, a fungus absorbs nutrients from its environment. It does this in a two-stage process. First, the hyphae secrete enzymes onto or into the food source, which break down biological polymers into smaller units such as monomers. These monomers are then absorbed into the mycelium by facilitated diffusion and active transport.

Mycelia are vital in terrestrial and aquatic ecosystems for their role in the decomposition of plant material. They contribute to the organic fraction of soil, and their growth releases carbon dioxide back into the atmosphere (see carbon cycle). Ectomycorrhizal extramatrical mycelium, as well as the mycelium of arbuscular mycorrhizal fungi, increase the efficiency of water and nutrient absorption of most plants and confers resistance to some plant pathogens. Mycelium is an important food source for many soil invertebrates. They are vital to agriculture and are important to almost all species of plants, many species co-evolving with the fungi. Mycelium is a primary factor in a plant's health, nutrient intake, and growth, with mycelium being a major factor to plant fitness.

Networks of mycelia can transport water  and spikes of electrical potential.

"Mycelium", like "fungus", can be considered a mass noun, a word that can be either singular or plural.  The term "mycelia", though, like "fungi", is often used as the preferred plural form.

Sclerotia are compact or hard masses of mycelium.

Uses

Agriculture
One of the primary roles of fungi in an ecosystem is to decompose organic compounds. Petroleum products and some pesticides (typical soil contaminants) are organic molecules (i.e., they are built on a carbon structure), and thereby show a potential carbon source for fungi. Hence, fungi have the potential to eradicate such pollutants from their  environment unless the chemicals prove toxic to the fungus. This biological degradation is a process known as bioremediation.

Mycelial mats have been suggested as having potential as biological filters, removing chemicals and microorganisms from soil and water. The use of fungal mycelium to accomplish this has been termed mycofiltration.

Knowledge of the relationship between mycorrhizal fungi and plants suggests new ways to improve crop yields.

When spread on logging roads, mycelium can act as a binder, holding disturbed new soil in place preventing washouts until woody plants can establish roots.

Fungi are essential for converting biomass into compost, as they decompose feedstock components such as lignin, which many other composting microorganisms cannot. Turning a backyard compost pile will commonly expose visible networks of mycelia that have formed on the decaying organic material within. Compost is an essential soil amendment and fertilizer for organic farming and gardening. Composting can divert a substantial fraction of municipal solid waste from landfills.

Commercial
Alternatives to polystyrene and plastic packaging can be produced by growing mycelium in agricultural waste.

Mycelium has also been used as a material in furniture, and artificial leather.

Construction material
Mycelium is a strong candidate for sustainable construction primarily due to its lightweight biodegradable structure, its ability to sequestrate carbon through photosynthesis, and its capacity to be grown from waste sources. In addition to this, mycelium has a relatively high strength-to-weight ratio and a much lower embodied energy compared to traditional building materials. Because mycelium takes the form of any mold it’s grown in, it can also be advantageous for customization purposes, especially if it’s employed as an architectural or aesthetic feature. Current research has also indicated that mycelium does not release toxic resins in the event of a fire because it has a charring effect similar to mass timber. In looking at wellbeing within physical spaces, Mycelium plays an interesting role in acoustic insulation, boasting of an absorbance of 70-75% for frequencies of 1500 Hz or less.

Strengths and weaknesses 

Mycelium bio-composites have shown strong potential for structural applications, with much higher strength-to-weight ratios than that of conventional materials due primarily to its low density. Compared to conventional building materials, mycelium also has a number of desirable properties that make it an attractive alternative. For example, it has low thermal conductivity and can provide high acoustic insulation. It is biodegradable, has much lower embodied energy, and can serve as a carbon sink, which makes mycelium bio-composites a possible solution to the emissions, energy, and waste associated with building construction. 

While mycelium proposes interesting implications as a structural material, there are several significant disadvantages that make it difficult to be practically implemented in large-scale projects. For one, mycelium does not have particularly high compressive strength on its own, ranging from 0.1-0.2 MPa. This is in stark comparison to traditional concrete, which typically has a compressive strength of 17-28 MPa. Even more, because mycelium is considered a living material, it holds specific requirements that make it susceptible to environmental conditions. For instance, it requires a constant source of air in order to stay alive, needs a relatively humid habitat to grow, and cannot be exposed to large amounts of water for fear of contamination and decay.

Mechanical properties 

3 separate fungi species (Colorius versicolor, Trametes ochracea, and Ganoderma sessile) were mixed independently with 2 substrates (apple and vine) and tested under separate incubation conditions in order to quantify certain mechanical properties of mycelium. In order to do this, samples were grown in molds, incubated, and dried over the course of 12 days. Samples were tested for water absorption using ASTM C272 guidelines and compared against an EPS material. Tiles of uniform size were cut from the fabricated mold and put under an Instron 3345 machine going at 1 mm/min, up until 20% deformation.

Throughout a 4 stage process, the impact of various substrate and fungal mixes was investigated along with properties of mycelium such as density, water absorption, and compressive strength. Samples were separated into two separate incubation methods and inspected for differences in color, texture, and growth. For the same fungi within each incubation method, minimal differences were recorded. However, across disparate substrate mixtures within the same fungi, colorization and external growth varied between the test samples. While loss of organic matter was calculated, no uniform correlation was found between substrate used and chemical properties of the material. For each of the substrate-fungi mixtures, average densities ranged from 174.1 kg/m3 to 244.9 kg/m3, with the Ganoderma sessile fungi and apple substrate combination being the most dense. Compression tests revealed the Ganoderma sessile fungi and vine substrate to have the highest strength of the samples tested, but no numerical value was provided. For reference, surrounding literature has provided a ballpark estimate of 1-72 kPa. Beyond this, mycelium has a thermal conductivity of 0.05–0.07W/m·K which is less than that of typical concrete.

Construction 

The construction of mycelium structures is primarily categorized into three approaches. These include growing blocks in molds, growing in place monolithic structures, and bio-welded units. The first approach cultivates mycelium and its substrate in forms, after which it is dried in ovens and then transported and assembled on site. The second approach uses existing formwork and adapts cast-in-place concrete techniques to grow monolithic mycelium structures in place. The third approach is a hybrid of the previous two referred to as myco-welding, where individual pre-grown units are grown together into a larger monolithic structure. 

Studies using grow-in-place methods and myco-welding have explored how to cultivate mycelium and re-use formwork in construction and investigated post-tensioning and friction connections. Research in fabrication has revealed some common challenges faced in construction of mycelium structures, mostly related to the growth of the fungi. It can be difficult to cultivate living material into formwork and it is susceptible to contamination if not properly sterilized. The fungi needs to be kept refrigerated to prevent hardening and properly manage growth and substrate consumption. Additionally, the thickness of fungal growth is limited by the presence of oxygen; if there is no oxygen, the center of the growth can die or be contaminated.

Environmental impact 

Researchers have performed life-cycle assessments to evaluate the environmental impact of mycelium bio-composites. In one recent study, mycelium bio-composite blocks were made using rapeseed straw and cellulose as substrate. A cradle-to-gate life cycle analysis was conducted focusing on the embodied energy and carbon of the manufacturing process. This accounted for the production of bags, molds, and raw material and the growth of the fungus and the composite. Metabolic CO2, or the CO2 that results from fungus growth, was calculated by relating the weight of the dry substrate with the burning carbon of cellulose during consumption. Within the manufacturing process, the emissions and energy associated with material cultivation, processing, inoculation, and incubation, and sterilization were also included in the analysis. Variations in incubation time, transportation distance, and processing energy were considered as well.

The embodied energy was found to be 860.3 MJ/m3 and the embodied carbon was -39.5 kg eqCO2 m3, which is lower than typical building materials. The fungal growth was identified as the largest contributor to energy consumption and CO2 emissions. Even when accounting for the short lifetime of mycelium compared to conventional building materials and the CO2 emissions during fungal growth, life cycle analysis results still showed the viability of mycelium as a carbon sink material and as a sustainable alternative to conventional building materials.

See also

References

External links 
 Mycelium at anbg.gov.au

Fungal morphology and anatomy